Visa requirements for Barbadian citizens are administrative entry restrictions by the authorities of other states placed on citizens of Barbados. As of 19 July 2022, Barbadian citizens had visa-free or visa on arrival access to 163 countries and territories, ranking the Barbadian passport 1st in the Caribbean, and 23rd overall, in terms of travel freedom according to the Henley Passport Index.

Visa requirements map

Visa requirements

Dependent, Disputed, or Restricted territories
Unrecognized or partially recognized countries

Dependent and autonomous territories

Non-visa restrictions

Caribbean
 Visa policy toward Barbadians in the region
 British
 Dutch
 French

Notes 
Notes

See also
Visa policy of Barbados
Barbados passport
Foreign relations of Barbados

References

External links
Official visa info to Barbados or for Barbadians, Min. of Foreign Affairs

Barbadian
Foreign relations of Barbados